Dena Carli is a former Democratic member of the Illinois House of Representatives. She represented the 1st District from 2011 to 2013. She was appointed to her seat in May 2011 after former incumbent Susana Mendoza resigned as District 1 representative to become Chicago city clerk. Carli has announced that she will not run for re-election.

Carli serves as a Chicago Police Sergeant. Her committee assignments include International Trade & Commerce, Consumer Protection, Tourism & Conventions, Adoption Reform, and Judiciary II - Criminal Law. She and her husband Dennis have three sons.

References

Members of the Illinois House of Representatives
Living people
Politicians from Chicago
Women state legislators in Illinois
Year of birth missing (living people)
21st-century American women